Patricia Carolina Pérez Goldberg (born 22 February 1974 in Santiago) is a Chilean lawyer and politician. She was Minister of Justice (2012–2014) during President Sebastián Piñera's first government.

Family & Studies
Pérez is daughter of a Carabineros officer and of a housewife. She grew up in Valparaíso.

She studied law at Universidad de Valparaíso and later completed a Master in Criminal Law and Criminal Sciences at Pontificia Universidad Católica de Valparaíso. She also completed a diploma course on criminal procedure reform in 2001 at Universidad de Chile Faculty of Law.

References

1974 births
Chilean Ministers of Justice
Women government ministers of Chile
Living people
Chilean women lawyers
21st-century Chilean lawyers
Government ministers of Chile
University of Valparaíso alumni
Pontifical Catholic University of Valparaíso alumni
University of Chile alumni
Academic staff of the Pontifical Catholic University of Valparaíso
Female justice ministers

21st-century women lawyers